Burkhala is an urban locality (an urban-type settlement) in Yagodninsky District of Magadan Oblast, Russia. Population:

Geography
The village lies in the Upper Kolyma region near the Debin river.

References

Urban-type settlements in Magadan Oblast